The 2020 Conference USA men's soccer season is the 26th season of men's varsity soccer in the conference. The season was slated to begin on August 29, 2020 and conclude on November 14, 2020. Due to the ongoing COVID-19 pandemic, the season was postponed to begin on February 3, 2021, and conclude on April 17, 2021.

Despite the delay, Kentucky, South Carolina, and UAB will be playing competitive fixtures during the fall season.

Due to the pandemic, the regular season champion earned the league's automatic bid.

Marshall, who won the conference, won the national title game 1–0 in overtime over Indiana. This was not only Marshall's first men's soccer title, but was also the first national title in a team sport won by a Conference USA member while affiliated with the league.

Background

Previous season 

The 2019 season saw Marshall win both the Conference USA regular season and tournament, the first time in program history. Marshall, Charlotte, and Kentucky earned berths into the 2019 NCAA Division I Men's Soccer Tournament. Charlotte and Kentucky were eliminated in the Second Round, while Marshall beat in-state rival, West Virginia to reach the Sweet Sixteen where they fell to the University of Washington.

Charlotte goalkeeper, Elliot Panicco earned the Senior CLASS Award.

Head coaches

Preseason

Preseason poll 

The preseason poll was released on January 27, 2021.

Preseason national rankings 
The preseason national rankings were to be announced in August 2020, but were postponed due to the COVID-19 pandemic. Only CollegeSoccerNews.com released a fall preseason poll.

Preseason All-Conference teams 

Preseason All-AAC Team

Fall 2020 season

Matches 
Kentucky, South Carolina, and UAB played competitive matches during the fall.

All times Eastern time.

Rankings

United Soccer Coaches 
During the fall 2020 season, United Soccer Coaches ran a Top 5 poll for the programs playing in fall.

Awards and honors

Spring 2021 season

Positions by round

Matches

Preseason exhibitions

Week 1 (Feb. 3 – Feb. 7)

Week 2 (Feb. 8 – Feb. 14)

Week 3 (Feb. 15 – Feb. 21)

Week 4 (Feb. 22 – Feb. 28)

Week 5 (Mar. 1 – Mar. 7)

Week 6 (Mar. 8 – Mar. 14)

Week 7 (Mar. 15 – Mar. 21)

Week 8 (Mar. 22 – Mar. 28)

Week 9 (Mar. 29 – Apr. 4)

Week 10 (Apr. 5 – Apr. 11)

Week 11 (Apr. 12 – Apr. 18)

Postseason

NCAA Tournament

MLS SuperDraft 
The MLS SuperDraft was held on January 21, 2021 and was held virtually through its website.

Total picks by school

List of selections

Notes

References 

 
2020 NCAA Division I men's soccer season
Association football events postponed due to the COVID-19 pandemic